Miriam Beerman (November 15, 1923 – February 2022) was an American abstract expressionist painter and printmaker. She was born in Providence, Rhode Island on November 15, 1923.

Education 
Miriam Beerman studied painting under John Frazier at the Rhode Island School for Design and earned her BFA. After earning her degree, she studied with various established artists including Yasuo Kuniyoshi at the Art Students League in NYC, with Adja Yunkers at the New School for Social Research in NYC, and Stanley William Hayter at Atelier 17 in Paris, France.

Career
Though Beerman maintained the gestural brushstrokes of the abstract expressionists, her work focuses on bestial characters who convey the intense emotion found in her images.  Her work includes automatic gestures, vivid colors, and stippled textures that help evoke the feeling of devastation. Some of her themes included biblical plagues, The Holocaust, the Atomic bombing of Hiroshima and Negasaki.

Beerman has received numerous grants and awards throughout her career. These include a CAPS grant from New York State Council on the Arts (1971), the Childe Hassam Purchase Award from the American Academy of Arts and Letters (1977), the Camargo Foundation Award (1980), a distinguished artist grant from the New Jersey State Council on the Arts (1987), and a 40-year retrospective of her work, held at the State Museum of New Jersey in Trenton (1991).

She was the first woman to ever have a solo exhibition at the Brooklyn Museum, and has since had 31 solo exhibitions of her work. Her work has been exhibited globally, including at the Corcoran Gallery of Art in Washington, DC, the Whitney Museum of American Art in New York, NY and at the Montclair Art Museum in Montclair, New Jersey. Her work is in the collection of The Newark Museum of Art and her work may be seen in over 60 museums.

In 2000, Beerman was an Artist's Book Resident at the Women's Studio Workshop in Rosendale, New York. During her residency, Beerman published Faces, a limited-edition portfolio of eight drypoint prints with text from The Notebooks of Malte Laurids Brigge by Rainer Maria Rilke.  The images are rough, humorous, and tragic, echoing the artist's humanistic concerns.

The artist's work was explored in a 2015 documentary film Miriam Beerman: Expressing the Chaos.   

Beerman died in February 2022, at the age of 98. A retrospective exhibition Miriam Beerman: 1923–2022 Nothing has changed was held at the Rechnitz Hall DiMattio Gallery in West Long Branch and included twenty large-scale paintings by the late artist.

Awards
Beerman received awards and honors from the Pollock Krasner and Joan Mitchell foundations, among others. She also received an alumni award from Rhode Island School of Design in 2015. 

In 2015, she had a collage retrospective at Lawrence University.  Miriam Beerman, Expressing the Chaos, a film by Jonathan Gruber, was also released in 2015. The film was shown on PBS and on  Dutch and New Zealand T.V.

References

External links 
 Miriam Beerman papers, circa 1930-2006, via the Archives of American Art, Smithsonian Institution

1923 births
2022 deaths
20th-century American painters
20th-century American women artists
21st-century American painters
21st-century American women artists
American women painters
Artists from Providence, Rhode Island
Atelier 17 alumni